Robert Post may refer to:

Robert Post (journalist) (1910–1943), reporter of The New York Times
Robert Post (law professor) (born 1947), professor of law at Yale Law School
Robert Post (musician) (born 1979), Norwegian singer-songwriter

See also 
Robert Poste, the father of the heroine Flora Poste, in Cold Comfort Farm